is a Japanese anime director. Starting his career at Madhouse, he is known for directing the anime series Death Parade, Mob Psycho 100, and Deca-Dence.

Biography
Tachikawa was born in Iruma District, Saitama on December 2, 1981.

In 2007, Tachikawa made his directorial debut with the final episode of the anime series Kiba. He later became a freelancer. In 2012, he directed the original video animation Arata-naru Sekai. The following year, Tachikawa worked with Madhouse on the anime film Death Billiards as part of the Anime Mirai program. The film later inspired an anime series titled Death Parade, with Tachikawa returning to direct. In 2014, he served as an assistant director for Terror in Resonance.

Tachikawa directed the anime adaptation of Mob Psycho 100 from 2016 to 2022. The series received multiple accolades at the Crunchyroll Anime Awards, winning Best Fight Scene and Best Action for the first season, and Best Animation and Best Opening Sequence for the second season. In 2020, he directed the original anime series Deca-Dence, which received three nominations at the 5th Crunchyroll Anime Awards. Tachikawa was nominated twice for Best Director for his work on Mob Psycho 100 and Deca-Dence.

Works

TV series
 Kiba (2007; episode director)
 Shigurui (2007; episode director)
 MapleStory (2008; storyboards, episode director)
 Bleach (2010–2012; storyboards, episode director)
 Lupin the Third: The Woman Called Fujiko Mine (2012; episode director)
 Sword Art Online (2012; storyboards)
 Terror in Resonance (2014; assistant director)
 Death Parade (2015; director)
 Mob Psycho 100 (2016–2022; director)
 The Saga of Tanya the Evil (2017; storyboards, episode director)
 Inuyashiki (2017; opening sequence director)
 Deca-Dence (2020; director)

Films
 Bleach: Hell Verse (2010; assistant director)
 Death Billiards (2013; director)
 Case Closed: Zero the Enforcer (2018; director)
 Blue Giant (2023; director)
 Detective Conan: Black Iron Submarine (2023; director)

Original video animation
 Arata-naru Sekai (2012; director)

Notes

References

External links
 

1981 births
Anime directors
Japanese animated film directors
Japanese storyboard artists
Japanese television directors
Living people
Madhouse (company) people
Nihon University alumni
People from Saitama Prefecture